Nambour railway station is located on the North Coast line in Queensland, Australia. It serves the town of Nambour in the Sunshine Coast Region.

History
On 16 December 1963, the present station building was opened by Minister for Transport Gordon Chalk. On 11 August 1988, a bus station was opened outside the station by Minister for Transport Ivan Gibbs. South of the station lie stabling sidings for electric multiple units. In 2016 a major upgrade to the station commenced.

Services
Nambour is the terminus for City network services from Brisbane with two services daily continuing to Gympie. To relieve congestion on the single track North Coast line, the rail service is supplemented by a bus service operated by Kangaroo Bus Lines on weekdays to Caboolture as route 649.

Nambour is also served by long-distance Traveltrain services; the Spirit of Queensland, Spirit of the Outback and the Bundaberg and Rockhamption Tilt Trains.

Services by platform

Transport links
Sunbus operate five routes to and from Nambour station:
610: to Sunshine Plaza via Kunda Park
612: to Sunshine Plaza via Bli Bli
630: to Noosa Junction via Doonan
631: to Noosa Junction via Cooroy
636: to University of the Sunshine Coast

Greyhound Australia operate services from Nambour station to Brisbane and Cairns.

References

External links

Nambour station Queensland Rail
Nambour station Queensland's Railways on the Internet

Nambour, Queensland
North Coast railway line, Queensland
Railway stations in Sunshine Coast, Queensland